Edvard Grieg composed the Cello Sonata in A minor, Op. 36 for cello and piano, and his only work for this combination, in 1882–83, marking a return to composition following a period when he had been preoccupied with his conducting duties at the Bergen Symphony Orchestra as well as illness.

The work borrows themes from Grieg's own Trauermarsch zum Andenken an Richard Nordraak (Funeral March in memory of Richard Nordraak) and the wedding march from his Drei Orchesterstücke aus Sigurd Jorsalfar (Three orchestral pieces from 'Sigurd Jorsalfar').  Grieg dedicated the piece to his brother, John, a keen amateur cellist. Friedrich Ludwig Grützmacher premièred the work with Grieg at the piano on 22 October 1883 in Dresden.

Structure

The sonata has three movements:
 Allegro agitato
 Andante molto tranquillo
 Allegro molto e marcato

The work takes approximately 26 minutes to perform.

Arrangements
 Violin and Piano arrangement by the composer, 1884
 Gary Karr and Joseph Horovitz arranged the sonata as a double bass concerto on his album Virtuoso Double Bass.
 Joseph Horovitz and Benjamin Wallfisch orchestrated the sonata as a cello concerto.

References 
Notes

Sources

External links 
 

Compositions by Edvard Grieg
Grieg, Edvard
1882 compositions
Compositions in A minor